Ernesto Horacio Boardman López (born February 23, 1993) is a Mexican competitive archer. He captured the men's team recurve title, alongside his compatriots Juan René Serrano and Luis Álvarez, in a historic final match against the United States at the 2015 Pan American Games in Toronto, Canada, and eventually competed as a lone male archer at the 2016 Summer Olympics, ending his run in an immediate departure from the initial round.

Boardman was selected to compete as a lone male archer for the Mexican team at the 2016 Summer Olympics, shooting only in the individual recurve tournament. First, he fired off a score of 662 points, including 25 targets of a perfect ten, for the twenty-eight spot against a field of 63 other archers in the qualifying round. Heading to the knockout stage, Boardman bowed out early in the opening round match to his Cuban opponent Adrián Puentes with a score of 4–6.

References

External links
 
 Profile at World Archery

1993 births
Living people
Mexican male archers
Sportspeople from Saltillo
Archers at the 2015 Pan American Games
Archers at the 2019 Pan American Games
Pan American Games gold medalists for Mexico
Archers at the 2016 Summer Olympics
Olympic archers of Mexico
Pan American Games medalists in archery
Central American and Caribbean Games silver medalists for Mexico
Central American and Caribbean Games gold medalists for Mexico
Competitors at the 2018 Central American and Caribbean Games
Central American and Caribbean Games medalists in archery
Medalists at the 2015 Pan American Games
20th-century Mexican people
21st-century Mexican people